Sebastiano Delli Frangi (22 August 1634 – October 1714) was a Roman Catholic prelate who served as Bishop of Cariati e Cerenzia (1688–1714).

Biography
Sebastiano Delli Frangi was born in Palma, Italy on 22 August 1634.
On 9 August 1688, he was appointed during the papacy of Pope Innocent XI as Bishop of Cariati e Cerenzia.
On 22 August 1688, he was consecrated bishop by Savo Millini, Bishop of Orvieto, with Pietro Francesco Orsini de Gravina, Archbishop of Benevento, and Gianfrancesco Riccamonti, Bishop of Cervia, serving as co-consecrators. 
He served as Bishop of Cariati e Cerenzia until his death in October 1714.

References

External links and additional sources
 (for Chronology of Bishops) 
 (for Chronology of Bishops) 

17th-century Italian Roman Catholic bishops
18th-century Italian Roman Catholic bishops
Bishops appointed by Pope Innocent XI
1634 births
1714 deaths